Ben-Zion Leitner ( 1927 – March 25, 2012) was an Israeli soldier, who received the nation's highest military decoration, the Hero of Israel citation (now the Medal of Valor), for heroism during the 1948 Arab–Israeli War.

He led an assault that resulted in the blowing up of a bunker at a police position in Iraq Suweidan which resulted in half of his face becoming paralysed.
He was a native of Odessa

References

1920s births
2012 deaths
Israeli soldiers
Military personnel from Odesa
Odesa Jews
Recipients of the Medal of Valor (Israel)
Soviet emigrants to Mandatory Palestine